Neutral language may refer to:
The Neutral Huron language
Gender-neutral language